The Yankee Handicap was an American Thoroughbred horse race first run at the 1935 opening meet of Suffolk Downs in East Boston, Massachusetts. A race for three-year-olds, it was contested on dirt at a mile and an eighth. (9 furlongs) and was usually held on the Columbus Day holiday. A February 19, 1989, issue of the Boston Globe said that the Yankee Handicap "used to be the hallmark of the fall [racing] season."

Last run in 1987, the race was won by stars such as Cravat (1938); Challedon (1939); Our Boots (1941); Shut Out (1942), who broke the track record; Never Bend (1963); and Timely Writer (1982).

References

1935 establishments in Massachusetts
1930s in Boston
1987 disestablishments in Massachusetts
1987 in Boston
Discontinued horse races in the United States
Horse races in the United States
Flat horse races for three-year-olds
Recurring sporting events disestablished in 1987
Recurring sporting events established in 1935
Sports competitions in Boston
Suffolk Downs